Birzeit University (BZU) is a public university in the West Bank, in the State of Palestine, registered by the Palestinian Ministry of Social Affairs as charitable organization. It is accredited by the Ministry of Higher Education and located in Birzeit, West Bank, near Ramallah. Established in 1924 as an Elementary School for girls, Birzeit became a University in 1975.

Birzeit University offers graduate and undergraduate programs in information technology, engineering, sciences, social policy, arts, law, nursing, pharmacy, health sciences, economics, and management. It has 9 faculties, including a graduate faculty. These offer 76 B.A. programs for undergraduate students and 39 M.A. programs for graduate students. As of 2020, more than 15,000 students are enrolled in the university's bachelor's, master's and PhD programs.

History

Birzeit School for Girls was founded in 1924 by Nabiha Nasir (1891-1951) as an elementary school for girls from Birzeit and the surrounding villages. It was one of the first schools in the region. In 1930, it broadened its scope to become a co-educational secondary school, and in 1932, it was renamed Birzeit Higher School. In 1942, the name was changed to Birzeit College. In 1953, a freshman higher education class was incorporated, followed by a sophomore class in 1961.

The Faculty of Information Technology was established in 2006 (later merged with the Faculty of Engineering to create the Faculty of Engineering and Technology), and in 2007, the Faculty of Arts was established. The Faculty of Nursing and Allied Health Professions (later renamed Faculty of Pharmacy, Nursing and Health Professions) was established in 2008.

In 2015, Birzeit University launched the Ph.D. program in social sciences, its first doctorate program. In 2016, the university was ranked first nationally in the January edition of the Webometrics Ranking of World Universities. 2018 saw the establishment of Birzeit University's newest college, the Faculty of Art, Music and Design. The university was ranked top nationally and among the top 3 percent of universities worldwide in the 2018 edition of the QS World University Rankings, and it retained its position in the 2019 edition.  

Dr. Beshara Doumani assumed office as President of the University in August of 2021. 

The university was closed from 1988 until 1992 by the Israeli army. The university was the last of 6 in Israeli occupied territories to reopen.

In December 2021, a series of violent incidents between students of rival Palestinian factions occurred in the campus. On 14 December 2021, Israeli soldiers and Shin Bet arrested a number of students allegedly involved with a Hamas cell, and accused of funneling money and organizing rallies in support of the organization, as well as incitement. The same day, hundreds of students took part in a Hamas parade on campus to mark the movement's founding anniversary. Some students also attacked the university's security guards.

On 10 January 2022, an undercover Israeli military unit known as the Mista'arvim stormed the university, shooting one student in the leg and detaining four other student activists.

Board of Trustees
Birzeit University is governed by an autonomous Board of Trustees composed of educators and professionals from the Palestinian community. The board appoints the president of the university. It also confirms the appointment of vice-presidents and deans upon the recommendation of the president. The board approves the budget and general development plans presented to it by the university council.

Administration
The university follows a semester system, with two four-month semesters beginning in Autumn and Spring, and two shorter two-month semesters in summer. Support comes from numerous Palestinian, Arab, and international foundations, as well as from various individuals.

Faculties
The university, through its nine faculties (Arts; Science; Business and Economics; Law and Public Administration; Engineering and Technology; Pharmacy, Nursing, and Health Professions; Education; Graduate Studies and Research, and Art Music and Design), provides academic programs(76 programs) that end in bachelor's degrees, such as the major/minor programs.

These faculties, in addition to the Graduate Studies and Research faculty, offer 39 postgraduate programs that lead to master's degrees. The university also offers 3 Ph.D. programs in Social Sciences; Computer Science and Mathematics.

Notable people
Currently, there are a number of professors who are also appointed as ministers in the current Palestinian government. 
Thirteen members of the Palestinian negotiating team in U.S.-sponsored Middle East peace talks were faculty members of Birzeit University. Hanan Ashrawi taught literature there.

The South African-born sociologist Stanley Cohen worked at Birzeit in support of Palestinian staff and students while a Professor in Criminology at the Hebrew University between 1980 and 1996.

Saeed Abu Ali worked as associate professor.

See also
 List of Palestinian universities
 Palestinian Galleries and Museums

References

External links

Official site
Official site 
Friends of Birzeit University
The Palestine and Arabic Study Abroad Program at Birzeit

 
Educational institutions established in 1924
1924 establishments in Mandatory Palestine
Birzeit
Nursing schools in the State of Palestine